Ectrodactyly with tibia aplasia/hypoplasia also known as cleft hand absent tibia is a very rare limb malformation syndrome which is characterized by ectrodactyly, and aplasia/hypoplasia of the tibia bone. Additional findings include cup-shaped ears, pre-postaxial polydactyly, and hypoplasia of the big toes, femur, patella, and ulnae bone. It is inherited as an autosomal dominant trait with reduced penetrance.

Etymology 

This disorder was first discovered in 1967, by Roberts et al. when he described a four-generation family with absence of the middle finger and missing tibia bones. Since then, 9 more families with the disorder have been described, leaving us with a total of 10 families worldwide known to medical literature with the disorder.

The following loci are associated with the different types of SHFLD: 1q42.2-43 (SHFLD1), 6q14.1 (SHFLD2), and 17p13.3 (SHFLD3). The mutations in the loci were found when the entire genome of a large Arab consanguineous family was analyzed.

References  

Diseases and disorders
Tibia